Marvin Jeremy Ashton (May 6, 1915 – February 25, 1994) was a Utah politician and a member of the Quorum of the Twelve Apostles of the Church of Jesus Christ of Latter-day Saints (LDS Church) from 1971 until his death in 1994.

Ashton was born to Marvin O. Ashton and Rachel Grace Jeremy in Salt Lake City, Utah. His father was a local LDS leader and later became a church general authority. Ashton worked in the lumber business as a youth. He graduated from the University of Utah. He worked as managing director of LDS Social Services. Ashton served as a member of the Utah State Senate from 1957 to 1961 as a Republican. He was also president of Deseret Book and involved in other business ventures including a lumber company.

LDS Church service
Ashton served a mission in Great Britain from 1937 to 1939 during which time he edited the Millennial Star. His mission president was Hugh B. Brown. From 1958 to 1969, Ashton was an assistant to the general superintendent of the church's Young Men's Mutual Improvement Association. He served as an assistant to superintendents Joseph T. Bentley and G. Carlos Smith.

He was named managing director of the then-newly formed Church Social Services Department in September 1969. A month later he was named an Assistant to the Quorum of the Twelve Apostles.

Ashton was ordained an apostle on December 2, 1971, after the death of Richard L. Evans. Among his assignments, he was president of the Polynesian Cultural Center and a member of the board of trustees of Brigham Young University–Hawaii.

Ashton died on February 25, 1994, and at the time of his death was serving as chairman of the church's Leadership Training Committee and was also a member of both the Correlation Executive and the General Welfare Services committees. The vacancy created in the Quorum of the Twelve was filled by Robert D. Hales.

Personal life
Ashton married Norma Berntson in the Salt Lake Temple on August 22, 1940, and they were the parents of four children. They won the mixed doubles championship in the all-church tennis tournament in 1954. Ashton was involved with the Boy Scouts of America most of his life and earned Eagle Scout as an adult in 1963. As an adult he was a recipient of the Distinguished Eagle Scout Award, the Silver Beaver Award, and the Silver Antelope Award.

Bibliography

See also
Carl W. Buehner
George R. Hill III

References

External links
General Authorities and General Officers: Elder Marvin J. Ashton

1915 births
1994 deaths
20th-century American politicians
20th-century American non-fiction writers
20th-century Mormon missionaries
American general authorities (LDS Church)
American Latter Day Saint writers
American Mormon missionaries in England
Apostles (LDS Church)
Assistants to the Quorum of the Twelve Apostles
Counselors in the General Presidency of the Young Men (organization)
People from Salt Lake City
Politicians from Salt Lake City
University of Utah alumni
Republican Party Utah state senators
20th-century American male writers
Latter Day Saints from Utah
American male non-fiction writers
Editors of Latter Day Saint publications